Cyprinus hieni is a species of ray-finned fish in the genus Cyprinus from freshwater habitats in Vietnam.

References

Cyprinus
Fish described in 2003
Endemic fauna of Vietnam
Fish of Vietnam
Cyprinid fish of Asia